The ancient Egyptian Night hieroglyph, Gardiner sign listed nos. N3 is a portrayal of the sky with the 'was' scepter hanging from it; it is in the Gardiner subset for "sky, earth, and water".

In the Egyptian language, the night hieroglyph is used as a determinative for words relating to 'obscurity'. In the language it is used for grh-(grḥ), and w(kh)-(uḫ) for night, and kkw-(kku) for dark, and a determinative for other related words.

See also
Sky (hieroglyph)
Gardiner's Sign List#N. Sky, Earth, and Water
List of Egyptian hieroglyphs

References

Betrò, 1995. Hieroglyphics: The Writings of Ancient Egypt, Betrò, Maria Carmela, c. 1995, 1996-(English), Abbeville Press Publishers, New York, London, Paris (hardcover)

Egyptian hieroglyphs: sky-earth-water